The Diary of Anne Frank – alternative title The Diary of a Young Girl – is the English translation of the Dutch book Het Achterhuis.

The Diary of Anne Frank may also refer to:

Film
 The Diary of Anne Frank (1959 film), 1959 adaptation directed by George Stevens
 Anne no Nikki, 1995 Japanese anime film

Opera
 The Diary of Anne Frank (opera) (composed in 1968, first performed in 1972), mono-opera composed by Grigory Frid

Radio
 The Diary of Anne Frank radio play (1952), adaptation by Meyer Levin

Television
 The Diary of Anne Frank (1967 film), TV film directed by Alex Segal
 The Diary of Anne Frank (1980 film), TV adaptation directed by Boris Sagal
 The Diary of Anne Frank (1987 TV series), a 1987 BBC televised serial starring Elizabeth Bell
 The Diary of Anne Frank (2009 TV series), a 2009 BBC adaptation directed by Jon Jones

Theatre
 The Diary of Anne Frank (play) (premiered in 1955), stage adaptation by Frances Goodrich and Albert Hackett